The 1883 Melbourne Cup was a two-mile handicap horse race which took place on Tuesday, 6 November 1883.

This year was the 23rd running of the Melbourne Cup. The race was run by 5/1 favourite Martini-Henry who became the first New Zealand bred horse to win the race. He also the first and to date only Melbourne Cup winner to have a hyphen in its name. Martini-Henry won this race at just his second start and had won the VRC Derby at his first start three days earlier. Martini-Henry would go on to the VRC St Leger in the autumn before break down in the Caulfield Cup and being retired to stud.

This is the list of placegetters for the 1883 Melbourne Cup.

See also

 Melbourne Cup
 List of Melbourne Cup winners
 Victoria Racing Club

References

External links
1883 Melbourne Cup footyjumpers.com

1883
Melbourne Cup
Melbourne Cup
19th century in Melbourne
1880s in Melbourne